The East Pointers are a Canadian contemporary folk music group from Prince Edward Island, who won the Juno Award for Traditional Roots Album of the Year for their album Secret Victory at the Juno Awards of 2017. The group originally consisted of guitarist Jake Charron, banjoist Koady Chaisson (d. 2022), and fiddler Tim Chaisson. They perform Celtic-influenced original songs and instrumentals with contemporary influences.

History
The three musicians formed The East Pointers in 2014. They began performing in Atlantic Canada, and they toured Ontario after gaining popularity in Canada's eastern provinces.  They released their debut album, Secret Victory, in late 2015, and promoted it through concert performances in Canada, the United States and Australia. They won the Canadian Folk Music Award for Ensemble of the Year at the 12th Canadian Folk Music Awards in 2016, and were nominated for Instrumental Group of the Year. In 2017, they performed in the United Kingdom. The band was nominated again for a Canadian Folk Music Award as Ensemble of the Year in 2018.

In 2020, during the COVID-19 pandemic in Canada, the band coordinated livestreamed weekly "#Annedemic" readings of Anne of Green Gables, with guest readers reading one chapter of the novel each week. Koady Chaisson read the first chapter; guest readers over the rest of the series included Anthony Field,Catherine MacLellan, Jenn Grant, Daniel Ledwell, Patrick Ledwell, Irish Mythen, Laura Cortese, Miranda Mulholland, Colin MacDonald of The Trews, Graham Wardle, Jonathan Torrens, and Megan Follows.

Koady Chaisson died in January 2022.

Members
Tim Chaisson (vocals, fiddle, drum machine), 
Jake Charron (guitar, synthesizer)

Former Members
Koady Chaisson (banjo, tenor guitar, synthesizer) (died January 6, 2022)

Discography

Studio albums 
 Secret Victory (2015)
 What We Leave Behind (2017)
 Yours to Break (2019)

Singles 
Wintergreen'' (2019)
Stronger Than You Know (2022)
I Saw Your Ghost (2022)

References

External links

 

Musical groups established in 2014
2014 establishments in Prince Edward Island
Canadian folk music groups
Canadian instrumental musical groups
Musical groups from Prince Edward Island
Juno Award for Traditional Roots Album of the Year winners
Canadian Folk Music Award winners
Celtic music groups